Arruda is a surname of Portuguese origin. It is also considered a Portuguese Sephardic Jewish surname. Variations of the surname include Arruda de and Arruda Sa. 

People with this name include:

People
Alan Arruda (born 1981), Brazilian footballer and coach
Ana Margarida Arruda (born 1955), Portuguese historian and archaeologist 
Axel Rodrigues de Arruda (born 1970), Brazilian footballer commonly known as Axel
Diogo de Arruda (before 1490–1531), Portuguese architect 
Ellen Arruda, American mechanical engineer
Helton Arruda (born 1978), Brazilian footballer known as Helton
Horacio Arruda (born 1960), Canadian doctor
Kiʻilani Arruda (born 2002), American beauty pageant titleholder
Manuel Arruda da Câmara (1752–1810), Portuguese cleric, physician, and botanist
Marcelino Junior Lopes Arruda (born 1989), Brazilian footballer better known as Mazola
Sérgio Arruda, Brazilian diplomat
Danielle Scott-Arruda (born 1972), American-Brazilian volleyball player

References 

Portuguese-language surnames
Sephardic surnames